Wister School may refer to:
 Mary Channing Wister School in Philadelphia
 John Wister School, in the School District of Philadelphia (now run by Mastery Charter Schools)
 Wister Public Schools in Oklahoma